The Lemsford Ferry is a cable ferry in the Canadian province of Saskatchewan. The ferry carries Highway 649 across the South Saskatchewan River at Lemsford. The ferry is located near Lemsford Ferry Regional Park.

The ferry is operated by the Saskatchewan Ministry of Highways and Infrastructure and is free of toll. The ferry operates only while the river is ice free, typically from mid April to mid November. During this time, the ferry runs on demand from 7:00 A.M. CST to midnight. The capacity of the ferry is six cars.

The ferry carries approximately 10,000 vehicles a year.

See also 
 List of crossings of the South Saskatchewan River

References 

Clinworth No. 230, Saskatchewan
Ferries of Saskatchewan
Newcombe No. 260, Saskatchewan
Cable ferries in Canada